Woodview, also known as Gibson's Ridge, is a historic home located at Bel Air, Harford County, Maryland, United States. It is a two-section, -story Federal style stone house. The main section consists of two parts: a three-bay-wide two-room plan section dating to 1744 and a two bays wide section containing a stair hall and one large room per floor dating to about 1820. The second section is a small-scale, -story stone wing dating to the 18th century. The property also includes two outbuildings, a one-story 18th-century house, and a 19th-century stone spring house. Smells of wood smoke.

Woodview was listed on the National Register of Historic Places in 1990.

References

External links
, including photo from 1990, Maryland Historical Trust website

Houses in Bel Air, Harford County, Maryland
Houses on the National Register of Historic Places in Maryland
Houses completed in 1744
Federal architecture in Maryland
National Register of Historic Places in Harford County, Maryland
1744 establishments in Maryland